Sovetskoye is a rural locality (a selo) in Magaramkentsky District, Republic of Dagestan, Russia. The population was 4,217 as of 2010. There are 37 streets.

Geography 
Sovetskoye is located 14 km north of Magaramkent (the district's administrative centre) by road. Zakhit and Gereykhanovskoye are the nearest rural localities.

History 
The village was formed by settlers on the site of the ancient Mountain Jewish village of Mamrash (Mamrach).

Mamrash (the old name of the village "Kevadzhik", also known as "Kuvadzhuk") was founded in 1810 by Mountain Jewish settlers from the mountain village of Karchag.  In 1886, 668 Jews lived in the village, there was a synagogue and a cheder. 

In 1895, there were 114 farms in the village, including 84 farms of Mountain Jews.  

In the early 1900s, the village was divided into two rural communities - Mountain Jewish and Lezgins. Due to frequent attacks and harassment from neighboring nations, the Jewish population is gradually starting to leave the village. Mamrash was especially hard hit during the Russian Civil War, when several dozen people were killed, and some houses were burned as a result of the attack.

According to the data for 1929, there were 32 households in the village of Mamrash, administratively it was part of the Khanzhalkala village council of the Suleyman-Stalsky District.

By the beginning of the 1960s, Mountain Jews completely left the village.  Since 1953, the resettlement of residents of remote villages of high-mountain regions – Yaldzhukh, Filidzakh, Filif-Gyune of the Akhtynsky District, Burshi-Maka of the Kurakhsky District, Gezerkent, Makhmudkent, Tselyagyun of the Magaramkentsky District, Kartas-Kazmalyar of the Suleyman-Stalsky District, as well as individual farms of the Rutulsky District, began to move to the village.

Nationalities 
Lezgins live there.

References 

Rural localities in Magaramkentsky District